The Bergetta Moe Bakery is a historic commercial building in Duluth, Minnesota, United States.  Constructed around 1875, it is one of Duluth's oldest standing buildings.  It was listed on the National Register of Historic Places in 1976 for its local significance in the theme of architecture.  It was nominated for exemplifying the simple wood-frame, gabled style that characterized Duluth's first-generation architecture.

See also
 National Register of Historic Places listings in St. Louis County, Minnesota

References

1875 establishments in Minnesota
Bakeries of the United States
Buildings and structures in Duluth, Minnesota
Commercial buildings completed in 1875
Commercial buildings on the National Register of Historic Places in Minnesota
National Register of Historic Places in St. Louis County, Minnesota